Gotcha! is a 1985 American action comedy film, starring Anthony Edwards and Linda Fiorentino and directed by Jeff Kanew, who also directed Edwards in Revenge of the Nerds in 1984.

Jonathan Moore (Edwards) is a shy UCLA veterinary student and the reigning champion at "Gotcha", a campus-wide paintball game. While on vacation in Paris, he is seduced by an older woman, the sexy and mysterious Sasha (Fiorentino) who turns out to be an international spy. When he returns home to Los Angeles, there is a strange canister of film in his backpack and a team of KGB agents on his back. Suddenly he is in the middle of a real life-or-death game of "Gotcha".

Plot
UCLA college student Jonathan Moore (Anthony Edwards) is playing a game called "Gotcha" (popular on mid-1980s college campuses as "Assassin" or "Tag"), wherein the players are all assigned a mock "hit" on another player by use of a harmless paintball, dart, or water gun. Moore and his roommate Manolo (Nick Corri) go on a vacation to Paris. After touring some of Paris, Moore meets Sasha Banicek (Linda Fiorentino), a Czechoslovakian girl, in a cafe. Jonathan has sex with Sasha, losing his virginity.

Jonathan decides to leave Manolo (who is heading to Spain) and go with Sasha to West Berlin to spend more time with her.  Jonathan believes that he is in love with Sasha. There, Jonathan and Sasha continue to have sex and even go to an Oktoberfest beer gathering. One night, Sasha tells Jonathan that she has to go to East Berlin to pick up a package, as she works as a courier. One night after arriving in East Berlin, Sasha leaves their hotel room and walks to dark street corner. There, Sasha meets a German man who tells her the location of the pickup of her package. Meanwhile, Sasha was being monitored by a Soviet agent, who was sitting in a car at a distance. The next day, Sasha tells Jonathan that if she gives him a certain message, it means that he must immediately leave East Berlin. At a cafe, Sasha gives Jonathan a package and says that a strudel is inside. A little later, Sasha tells Jonathan to meet her at the butcher shop near their hotel. All of a sudden, a Soviet agent begins to chase after her. She is ordered by the German man to use Jonathan to unknowingly get the package over to West Berlin, so the next time they are together she slips an object into his backpack. Later, Sasha is taken by the Soviet agent and East German secret police.

Jonathan goes to Checkpoint Charlie to cross the heavily fortified border into West Berlin. At the East German customs search, Jonathan is stripped of his clothes and his backpack is searched (but the unknown object is not found). Meanwhile, Sasha is stripped and given a cavity search for possible espionage evidence. The Soviet agent arrives at the border crossing to search for Jonathan, who has crossed the border safely before he could be captured. Once in West Berlin, Jonathan feels liberated by the Westernized society. In the hotel, Jonathan receives a message from Sasha to meet him. Jonathan finds out that his hotel room was broken into and robbed of his traveler's checks. Soviet agents eventually find Jonathan in West Berlin at the location Sasha gave him, where he meets a woman who asks for the object Sasha gave him. He gives her the strudel, but she tells him that is not the object, and is shot by the Soviets, who chase him throughout a public park. Jumping into a water canal, Jonathan manages to escape from the Soviets and stumbles upon a German punk rock group headed for Hamburg, who offer him a ride to the airport.

The punk rock group successfully get Jonathan to the airport (using full-face makeup to sneak him past a checkpoint) and Jonathan finally arrives in Los Angeles Tom Bradley International Airport and to his apartment. Soon, a band of Soviet agents also arrive in Los Angeles. Once home, Jonathan stumbles upon a film canister in his backpack - the object planted by Sasha. Jonathan visits his parents and tells them what happened in Germany, but they do not believe any of it and think Jonathan is on drugs. Jonathan decides to call the FBI, who refuse to help him and tell him to call the CIA for help. He does this, telling them about Sasha and the film. Jonathan returns to find his apartment broken into and looted.

The CIA officer tells Jonathan to give them the photo film canister. At the Los Angeles headquarters of the CIA, Jonathan spots Sasha, who looks like she is working there. Jonathan is able to arrange a meeting with Sasha, and uses Manolo's help to separate her from the CIA agents. Sasha admits that she is Cheryl Brewster, a CIA agent originally from Pittsburgh. Out of nowhere, the Soviet agents begin to chase Jonathan and Sasha on the UCLA campus. Jonathan tranquilizes all the Soviets, later explaining that he got the tranquilizer gun from the campus veterinary sciences building. The Soviets are arrested, the CIA agents thank Jonathan for his (indirect) help in obtaining the film, and Cheryl/Sasha tells him she wants to continue their relationship.

After they part, Jonathan talks to a pretty student who rebuffed him at the start of the movie, and she coldly turns him down. As she walks away, he aims the tranquilizer pistol and shoots her in the rear.

Cast

 Anthony Edwards as Jonathan Moore
 Linda Fiorentino as Sasha Banicek / Cheryl Brewster, CIA Agent
 Nick Corri as Manolo, Jonathan's roommate and friend
 Alex Rocco as Al Moore, Jonathan's father
 Marla Adams as Maria Moore, Jonathan's mother
 Klaus Löwitsch as Vlad
 Bata Kameni as KGB goon
 Christopher Rydell as Bob Jensen
 Brad Cowgill as Reilly
 Kari Lizer as Muffy
 David Wohl as Professor at the campus
 Irene Olga López as Rosario
 Christie Claridge as Girl Student
 Reggie Thompson as Checkpoint Charlie Guard (SGT 42nd Engineers, BBDE, US Army)

Production
Gotcha! was filmed in October 1984, with principal photography in Los Angeles, Paris and West Berlin.

Soundtrack
The Original Soundtrack album for Gotcha! was released on LP in 1985 on the MCA Records label. It features the theme song "Gotcha!" by British singer Thereza Bazar, which was recorded for the film; however the single did not chart. The album also included songs by Giuffria and Nik Kershaw, among others. Songs used in the film but not included on the MCA soundtrack album included "Two Tribes" and "Relax" by Frankie Goes To Hollywood.

In 2020 Intrada Records released a limited edition album of Bill Conti's 28 minute long score, two tracks of which were on the 1985 soundtrack album. One cue was re-arranged for the 1985 soundtrack album. None of the pop songs could be licensed for this release.

Reception
Vincent Canby of The New York Times noting the film "... is a small but elaborately overproduced comedy-melodrama." He went on to deride the lack of flair in the film; "... as devoid of personality as it's possible for a narrative movie to be." In a similar vein, Leonard Maltin commented that Gotcha! was, "very nearly a good movie, with some sharp dialogue to start but loses its appeal as it loses credibility." Roger Ebert gave the film 2 stars out of 4. He described the European sequences as "a well-directed cat-and-mouse game" that lost its way in the final act after returning to the US, with the film's main flaw being a focus on Edwards's character when Fiorentino was far more intriguing: "I'll bet the men who made this movie just assumed it had to be told from his point of view, and never considered hers. Too bad. I think they missed their best chance."

, Gotcha! had a 31% rating on Rotten Tomatoes based on 13 reviews, with an average rating of 4.95/10.

In popular culture
Gotcha! later spawned a game for the Nintendo Entertainment System for use with the Zapper light gun called Gotcha! The Sport! (1987). A line of toys based on the game and film was also released.

In the television series Chuck, the name "Sasha Banicek" is used for a character played by guest-star Melinda Clarke in the episode "Chuck vs. The Seduction" that aired on October 6, 2008.

See also
 List of American films of 1985
 Assassin
 Tag: The Assassination Game
 Stinking badges

Notes

References

Bibliography

External links
 
 
 
 
 

1985 films
1980s action comedy films
1980s spy comedy films
American action comedy films
American spy comedy films
Cold War spy films
Teen sex comedy films
Films about vacationing
Films directed by Jeff Kanew
Films scored by Bill Conti
Films set in Berlin
Films set in Los Angeles
Films set in Paris
Universal Pictures films
1985 comedy films
Films set in West Germany
Films set in East Germany
Films about the Central Intelligence Agency
Films set in universities and colleges
1980s English-language films
1980s American films